The MAC Football Championship Game is a football game between the winners of the East and West divisions of the Mid-American Conference (MAC) to determine the conference champion.

History

The game has been played since 1997, when the conference was first divided into divisions and since 2020 has been sponsored by Rocket Mortgage (officially known as the Rocket Mortgage MAC Football Championship).  The winner of the game is guaranteed a berth in a bowl game which the MAC has contractual obligations to field a team.  Unlike the MAC's Group of Five contemporaries, which hold their respective championship games on campus sites, the MAC Championship Game is held at a neutral site, Ford Field in Detroit, Michigan since 2004 and is scheduled to be held there through at least 2024.

In 2000, 2001, and 2007, due to an unbalanced conference schedule, the team with best division record within each division was awarded that division's championship game berth. In other years, the teams with the best overall conference records received a berth.

The game is held on the first Saturday in December, on the same weekend that other NCAA Division I FBS conferences hold their championship games.

Results
Below are the results from all MAC Football Championship Games played. The winning team appears in bold font, on a background of their primary team color. Rankings are from the AP Poll released prior to the game.

From 1997 through 2003, the championship game was played at campus sites. Since 2004, the game has been played at Ford Field in Detroit.

Results by team

Eastern Michigan is the only team currently in the conference to have not qualified for a Championship Game. Marshall is the only Championship Game Winner to not be a current member of the MAC. Bowling Green is the only team that has represented both the East and West Divisions in the Championship Game (was a member of the West Division prior to Marshall's departure from the MAC). Temple, UCF and UMass were previously in the conference during this era and never reached the championship game.

Common matchups
Matchups that have occurred more than once:

MVPs

Game records

Source:

Photo gallery

See also
 List of NCAA Division I FBS conference championship games

References